WNMX may refer to:

 WYRD-FM, a radio station (106.3 FM) licensed to Simpsonville, South Carolina, United States, which held the call sign WNMX from 1989 to 1995 
 WOLS, a radio station (106.1 FM) licensed to Waxhaw, North Carolina, United States, which held the call sign WNMX-FM from 1996 to 2008
 WGFY, a radio station (1480 AM) licensed to Charlotte, North Carolina, United States, which held the call sign WNMX from 1996 to 1997
 WVHK, a radio station (100.7 FM) licensed to Christianburg, Virginia, United States, which held the call sign WNMX from 2009 to 2018